Israr Hussain (1986) is a Pakistani swimmer. He participated in his first Olympics at the 2012 London Games.

Career

2012
Hussain participated on a wild card in 100m freestyle at the London Olympic Games.  Unfortunately he did not qualify from the heats.

2014 
He competed at the 2014 Commonwealth Games, in the 100, 200 and 400 m freestyle events.

References

Pakistani male swimmers
Olympic swimmers of Pakistan
1986 births
Living people
Swimmers at the 2012 Summer Olympics
Swimmers from Rawalpindi
Swimmers at the 2014 Commonwealth Games
Commonwealth Games competitors for Pakistan
South Asian Games bronze medalists for Pakistan
South Asian Games medalists in swimming
20th-century Pakistani people
21st-century Pakistani people